The 1912 Minnesota Golden Gophers football team represented the University of Minnesota in the 1912 college football season. In their 13th year under head coach Henry L. Williams, the Golden Gophers compiled a 4–3 record (2–2 against Western Conference opponents) and outscored their opponents by a combined total of 87 to 38.

Schedule

References

Minnesota
Minnesota Golden Gophers football seasons
Minnesota Golden Gophers football